The Lansdowne Tapes is a compilation album by the British rock band Uriah Heep and released in 1993. The recordings featured on the album date from the time before the change of name to Uriah Heep and during the early sessions that culminated in material eventually used on the bands debut album.

About half of the recordings belong to a band called Spice, which featured Mick Box, David Garrick — who later changed his name to David Byron — Paul Newton and Alex Napier; they were signed to Gerry Bron's company Hit Record Productions on 1 August 1969. These early recordings feature tracks laid down by Spice at the Lansdowne Studios from July to December 1969, many of which formed part of Spice's live set at the time. Originally intended for an album release, some of the songs were shelved when Ken Hensley became a member of the band in February 1970. His influence gave them a distinctive sound which was marked with a name change to Uriah Heep, in time for their first album ...Very 'Eavy ...Very 'Umble scheduled for May 1970 release.

The rest of the album features material taped by the embryonic Uriah Heep line-ups. It includes several takes of old favourites and previously unreleased tracks that were recorded for the first three albums, all taped during 1969-1971.

Much of the material required extensive recovery work and all has been newly mixed down from the original 8-track tapes at Lansdowne Studios. Box, Newton and Hensley have co-operated in the production, reportedly fascinated to hear this old material once again. The collector's edition is complemented by an inlay of rare photos from the period, together with cuttings, a full history of the transition from Spice to Uriah Heep, and details of each individual track.

Track listing

Formations
SPICE : Mick Box (guitars), David Byron (vocals), Paul Newton (bass), Alex Napier (drums), Colin Wood (keyboards)
URIAH HEEP 1: Mick Box (guitars), David Byron (vocals), Paul Newton (bass), Nigel Olsson (drums), Ken Hensley (keyboards)
URIAH HEEP 2: Mick Box (guitars), David Byron (vocals), Paul Newton (bass), Keith Baker (drums), Ken Hensley (keyboards)
URIAH HEEP 3: Mick Box (guitars), David Byron (vocals), Paul Newton (bass), Iain Clark (drums), Ken Hensley (keyboards)

Production
Gerry Bron – original recordings producer
Peter Gallen – engineer
Track recovery, mixing & post production - Robert M. Corich 
Robert M. Corich – compilation producer

References

1993 compilation albums
Uriah Heep (band) compilation albums
Albums produced by Gerry Bron